Margarita Cabrera (born 1973) is a Mexican-American artist and activist. As an artist, the objects and activities she produces address issues related to border relations, labor practices and immigration. Her practice spans smaller textile-based soft sculptures to large community-involved public artworks. In 2012 she was a recipient of the Knight Artist in Residence at the McColl Center for Visual Art in Charlotte, NC. Cabrera was also a recipient of the Joan Mitchell Foundation Grant.

Early life and education

Cabrera was born in the city of Monterrey in the state of Nuevo Leon, México. She moved to the U.S. at around the age of 10, when her family was in search of better opportunities. Her inspiration to become an artist began in her childhood, when she was exposed to the Montessori system of education.

Cabrera received a BFA degree in 1997 and an MFA degree in 2001 from Hunter College in New York, New York.

Work

Cabrera's artistic output includes both contemporary sculpture and public artworks. 

Cabrera's soft sculptures are modelled on the shape of common appliances and machines, created from fabric and thread. She has made soft sculptures of coffee makers, bicycles, sewing machines,  backpacks, as well as the Hummer and Volkswagen beetle automobiles.
Cabrera has stated that these works are intended as an insight into the lives of laborers working in the Mexican appliance factories, or maquiladoras, that produce the real articles just south of the US-Mexico border. In the process of creating her soft sculptures, Cabrera often works with displaced immigrants living on the American side of the border. 

Cabrera's use of community involvement in the production of her soft sculptures has led her to create more engaged public artworks. Since 2010 she has run workshops on the production of art projects in Arizona and Texas, inviting the participation of new immigrants. 

Cabrera is an assistant professor in the Herberger Institute for Design and the Arts at Arizona State University.

Public Art
Uplift, installed in El Paso, Texas in March 2015. Removed in 2015 by the city of El Paso.
Árbol de la Vida: Memorias y Voces de la Tierra, installed in San Antonio, Texas in 2019. Made in collaboration with 700 members of local community.

Collections
Allen Memorial Art Museum
Smithsonian Museum of American Art 
Museum of Fine Arts Houston 
McNay Museum, San Antonio 
Sweeney Center for Contemporary Art at the University of California, Riverside 
Sun Valley Center for the Arts 
El Museo del Barrio, New York City

References

External links 
Official site

1972 births
People from Nuevo León
20th-century Spanish painters
20th-century sculptors
Modern painters
Mexican sculptors
Spanish sculptors
Living people